Culi may refer to:

People
 Diana Çuli (born 1951), Albanian writer, journalist and politician
 José Culí (1906–1971), Spanish athlete
 Yaakov Culi

Places
 Culi (mountain), Peru